John Ferenzik (born John Michael Ferencsik 13 October 1955 in Philadelphia, Pennsylvania) is an American musician, keyboardist, guitarist and composer. He has performed most notably with Todd Rundgren (on keyboards, vocals and electric guitar), and also Jefferson Starship (on keyboards, electric guitar, and bass guitar) and Beru Revue (on keyboards and backing vocals).

Discography

Solo Artist
Wild Man Of Borneo (album) (label: Rraxxo 1990)
Devil's Playground (album) aka "ferenzik's Devil's Playground" (label: Rraxxo 1995)
Wheel Of Nesh (album) (label: Rraxxo 1997)
Zero Points For Zeus (album) (label: Rraxxo 2000)
House Of Boris (album) (label: Rraxxo 2004)

With "Todd Rundgren"
The Individualist  (label: Ion Records  1995)
With A Twist  (label: Guardian 1997)
One Long Year  (label: Artemis 2000)

With "The Strapping Fieldhands"
Discus (label: Omphalos Records 1990)
Wattle And Daub (label: Shangri-La Records, 1994)
Gobs On The Midway (label: Siltbreeze Records, 1994)

Miscellaneous Recordings
Lynne Me Your Ears – A Tribute To The Music Of Jeff Lynne (Compilation) (Label: NotLame 2004) song title: "The Minister"
The Jam Band Tribute to Frank Zappa (Compilation) (Label: CMH Records 2002) song title: "Cosmik Debris"
Mama Kangaroos: Philly Women Sing Captain Beefheart (Compilation) (Label: Genus Records 2005) song title: "Abba Zaba"

References

External links
ferenzik.com (official website)
facebook.com/ferenzikmusic (facebook website)
myspace.com/ferenzikmuzik (myspace website)

1955 births
Living people
American rock keyboardists
American rock guitarists
American male guitarists
American male composers
20th-century American composers
Guitarists from New Jersey
American session musicians
Guitarists from Philadelphia
20th-century American guitarists
20th-century American male musicians